Borwin, Duke of Mecklenburg (given names: Georg Borwin Friedrich Franz Karl Stephan Konrad Hubertus Maria; born 10 June 1956) has been the head of the House of Mecklenburg-Strelitz since 1996 and of the entire House of Mecklenburg since 2001. The death of Friedrich Franz, Hereditary Grand Duke of Mecklenburg-Schwerin – his godfather – the last male member of the House of Mecklenburg-Schwerin on 31 July 2001 made Strelitz the only remaining line of the House of Mecklenburg, which ruled in Mecklenburg until 1918.

Borwin and his sons, Alexander and Michael, are the only known surviving legitimate male-line descendants of the medieval princely dynasty descended from Niklot of the Obotrites, which has included Albert, King of Sweden.

Education and career
Duke Borwin of Mecklenburg was born in Freiburg im Breisgau the youngest child and only son of Duke Georg Alexander of Mecklenburg and his wife Archduchess Ilona of Austria (1927–2011) the daughter of Archduke Joseph Francis of Austria and Princess Anna of Saxony. He is an agnatic descendant of Grand Duke Georg of Mecklenburg-Strelitz and through his mother a descendant of King Frederick Augustus III of Saxony and Emperor Franz Joseph I of Austria.

Duke Borwin became the heir apparent to headship of the House of Mecklenburg-Strelitz on 6 July 1963 when his grandfather died and his father succeeded as head of the house. Borwin has studied Viticulture at the Geisenheim Grape Breeding Institute and served as an officer in the German Army. He has also managed a Swiss drinks company.

In politics, Duke Borwin is a former local party chairman for the Christian Democratic Union in the village of Hinterzarten in the Breisgau-Hochschwarzwald district of Baden-Württemberg, leaving his post in May 2009.

Head of the house
In 1928 his grandfather George was adopted by his uncle and the head of the House of Mecklenburg-Strelitz, Duke Charles Michael. His grandfather subsequently assumed the title of Duke of Mecklenburg with the style Serene Highness which was confirmed on 18 July 1929 by the head of the Imperial House of Russia, Grand Duke Cyril Vladimirovich and then recognised on 23 December by the former Grand Duke Frederick Francis IV of Mecklenburg-Schwerin. On 18 December 1950, Hereditary Grand Duke Friedrich Franz of Mecklenburg-Schwerin confirmed the ducal title and also granted the style Highness, which in conjunction with the title, is the style enjoyed by dynastic members of the House of Mecklenburg. His grandfather was also confirmed as head of the house.

Duke Borwin succeeded as head of the House of Mecklenburg-Strelitz following his father's death on 26 January 1996. With the death of Hereditary Grand Duke Friedrich Franz on the 31 July 2001, the House of Mecklenburg-Schwerin has become extinct in the male line leaving Mecklenburg-Strelitz as the only surviving branch of the grand ducal house.

Duke Borwin is the patron and protector of the Order of the Griffon which was revived in September 1984. The order was founded by Grand Duke Frederick Francis III of Mecklenburg-Schwerin on 15 September 1884. He has also served on the Almanach de Gotha's Comité de Patronage.

In 2005 Duke Borwin along with the head of the House of Hohenzollern, Georg Friedrich, Prince of Prussia attended the seasonal opening of Hohenzieritz Castle in Mecklenburg-Vorpommern. It was the castle where Louise of Mecklenburg-Strelitz, who married Frederick William III of Prussia and became Queen of Prussia, died in 1810.

Marriage and children
Duke Borwin married Alice Marianne Wagner (born 2 August 1959 in Hinterzarten, Baden-Württemberg, West Germany), daughter of Dr. Jürgen-Detlev Wagner and wife Marianne Biehl (3 February 1930 – Hinterzarten, 26 April 2008), in a civil marriage on 24 December 1985 in Hinterzarten followed by a religious ceremony on 19 July 1986 also in Hinterzarten. They have three children. 
 Duchess Helene Olga Feodora Donata Maria Katharina Theresia of Mecklenburg (born 13 October 1988 in Freiburg im Breisgau)
 Duke Georg Alexander Michael Heinrich Ernst Franz Ferdinand Maria of Mecklenburg (born 17 July 1991 in Freiburg im Breisgau). Married civilly in Mirow Palace, on 17 June 2022 and religiously in Neustrelitz on 17 September 2022 to Hande Macit, born in Tarsus, on 16 September 1992, only daughter of Suphi Macit and wife Cemile Uçar. The couple is based in the Netherlands where they run a business together with her brother.
 Duke Carl Michael Borwin Georg Friedrich Franz Hubertus Maria of Mecklenburg (born 30 January 1994 in Freiburg im Breisgau)

Honours

National dynastic honours
 House of Mecklenburg: Sovereign Knight Grand Cross with Collar of the House Order of the Wendish Crown
 House of Mecklenburg: Sovereign Knight Grand Cross of the Order of the Griffon

Foreign dynastic honours
 Montenegrin Royal Family: Knight of the Royal Order of Saint Peter of Cetinje
 Montenegrin Royal Family: Knight Grand Cross of the Royal Order of Prince Danilo I, Special Class

Ranks
 : Member of the Sons of the American Revolution

Ancestry

Patrilineal descent
Niklot, Prince of the Obotrites and Lord of Mecklenburg, 1090–1160
Pribislav of Mecklenburg, Prince of the Obotrites and Lord of Mecklenburg, d. 1178
Henry Borwin I, Lord of Mecklenburg, d. 1227
Henry Borwin II, Lord of Mecklenburg, 1170–1226
John I, Lord of Mecklenburg, 1211–1264
Henry I, Lord of Mecklenburg, 1230–1302
Henry II, Lord of Mecklenburg, 1266–1329
Albert II, Duke of Mecklenburg, 1318–1379
Magnus I, Duke of Mecklenburg, 1345–1384 (younger brother of Albert III, Duke of Mecklenburg, Albert, King of Sweden)
John IV, Duke of Mecklenburg, 1370–1422
Henry IV, Duke of Mecklenburg, 1417–1477
Magnus II, Duke of Mecklenburg-Schwerin and Güstrow, 1441–1503
Albert VII, Duke of Mecklenburg-Schwerin and Güstrow, 1486–1547
John Albert I, Duke of Mecklenburg-Schwerin and Güstrow, 1525–1576
John VII, Duke of Mecklenburg-Schwerin, 1558–1592
Adolphus Frederick I, Duke of Mecklenburg-Schwerin, 1588–1658
Adolphus Frederick II, 1st Duke of Mecklenburg-Strelitz, 1658–1708
Duke Charles Louis Frederick of Mecklenburg-Strelitz, 1708–1752
Charles II, Grand Duke of Mecklenburg-Strelitz, 1741–1816
George, Grand Duke of Mecklenburg-Strelitz, 1779–1860
Duke George Augustus of Mecklenburg-Strelitz, 1824–1876
Duke George Alexander of Mecklenburg-Strelitz, 1859–1909
George, Duke of Mecklenburg, 1899–1963
George Alexander, Duke of Mecklenburg, 1921–1996
Borwin, Duke of Mecklenburg, b. 1956

References

External links
The Order of the Griffin 
House of Mecklenburg-Strelitz website

1956 births
Living people
House of Mecklenburg
House of Mecklenburg-Strelitz
House of Mecklenburg-Schwerin
German royalty
Hereditary Grand Dukes of Mecklenburg-Strelitz
Dukes of Mecklenburg-Strelitz
Hereditary Grand Dukes of Mecklenburg-Schwerin
Dukes of Mecklenburg-Schwerin
Pretenders to the Mecklenburg thrones
People from Freiburg im Breisgau
German people of Austrian descent
German people of Russian descent
German people of Italian descent
German people of Portuguese descent
Military personnel from Freiburg im Breisgau